Rumford Mill is a pulp mill and paper mill located in the United States town of Rumford, Maine. The mill has two kraft pulp lines and three paper machines. The mill produces 460,000 tonnes of kraft pulp and 565,000 tonnes of paper annually. The mill has 621 employees as of 2016. Now owned by ND Paper LLC, a wholly owned subsidiary of Nine Dragons Paper Holdings Limited, the mill is now known as ND Paper–Rumford Mill.

The mill was established in 1901 by Hugh J. Chisholm. He had established the Portland and Rumford Falls Railway, which was completed in 1892 and aimed at exploiting the falls to manufacture paper. The Oxford Paper Company grew out of this mill and remained owned by the Chisholm family until 1967. Rumford was the sole manufacturer of US Post Office postcards, as well as the country's largest bookpaper manufacturer. Ownership passed to Ethyl Corporation in 1967, Boise Cascade Paper Company in 1976, Mead Corporation in 1996, Cerberus Capital Management as NewPage in 2005 and Catalyst Paper in 2015. In 2018 the mill was acquired by Nine Dragons Paper Holdings Limited. Starting in early 2019 ND Paper started rolling out a new “Clean Production” requirement mill wide. The Mill also received an extensive painting effort throughout 2019. In late 2019 ND Paper started in effort to have hard hats, gloves, and pants be worn at all time. (opposed to the previously acceptable shorts.)

The mill is made up of numerous departments and facilities.

15 paper machine and 15 finishing are located in the same building closest to the lower gate security building. 15 finishing is located directly under the paper machine. This allows an efficient transfer of the paper once finished on the machine to be directly run to finishing to be cut for order. The building also contains an office space and locker room, separate men's and women's.

10 paper machine and #12 paper machine are located parallel to one another, separated by the blueprint of what used to be the location of #11 paper machine. 11 has been removed due to cutting costs.

Both 10 and 12’s paper is sent by Nellie Bell (industrial truck) on trailer down a roughly 100-yard path into the north end finishing department. Here the paper is delivered to a supercalender, winder, or placed on a storage cart if no location is ready.

North End Finishing (NEF) is mostly referred to as “The North End”. It houses 4 winders and 4 supercalenders with a salvage winder also located within the department but with no affiliation. Winders in layout from south to north are 38, 33, 35, and 44, with the following supercalenders located almost directly behind the previously listed winders; 21, 22, 24, & 25.

References

Pulp and paper mills in the United States
Buildings and structures in Oxford County, Maine
Rumford, Maine
1901 establishments in Maine
Catalyst Paper
Pulp and paper industry in Maine
American companies established in 1901
Companies based in Oxford County, Maine
Industrial buildings completed in 1901